Llangybi (English: Cybi's Church) is a village and former civil parish in the Eifionydd area of the Welsh county of Gwynedd, near Llanarmon.  The parish was abolished in 1934 and divided between Llanystumdwy and Llannor.

St Cybi's church is a grade II* building.

As well as various menhirs, tumuli and stone circles in the countryside around, the village is particularly noted for a holy well, Ffynnon Gybi (English: St Cybi's Well). According to local tradition the girls who wished to know their lover's intentions would spread their pocket-handkerchiefs on the water of the well, and, if the water pushed the handkerchiefs to the south they knew that everything was right and that their lovers were honest and honourable in their intentions; but, if the water shifted the handkerchiefs northwards, they concluded the contrary.  A reference to this is made in severe terms by a modern Welsh poet.

"This parish, which derives its name from the dedication of its church to Saint Cybi, an eminent British saint, who flourished towards the close of the sixth century, is pleasantly situated in the south-western portion of the county, and nearly in the centre of the promontory which separates Cardigan bay from the bay of Carnarvon. It is of very considerable extent, and the lands are mostly enclosed and in a good state of cultivation : the surrounding scenery is pleasingly diversified, comprising some fine views of the adjacent country, which abounds with varied and picturesque beauty. At Pontrhyd Goch is a slate quarry, which, however, is worked only on a limited scale, the slates being of rather an inferior quality, and the demand for them confined principally to the immediate neighbour-hood. The road from Carnarvon to Pwllheli passes through the parish.

References

Bibliography

Sacred Wells in Wales by John Rhys and T. E. Morris, in Folklore, Vol. 4, No. 1 (Mar., 1893), pp. 55–79

Villages in Gwynedd
Llanystumdwy
Water wells in Wales